Supraviețuitorul: Filipine was the first season of Supraviețuitorul, a Romanian television series based on the popular reality game show Survivor. This season was announced by Pro TV on 23 December 2015 and was filmed in Caramoan, Camarines Sur, Philippines from June to July 2016. It aired from 12 September to 22 November 2016 on Pro TV. Hosted by Romanian journalist Dragoș Bucurenci, the program featured 18 Romanian castaways competing for 44 days. The grand prize, won by Lucian "Zapp" Lupu, consisted of €100,000.

The 18 castaways were divided into two tribes of nine, each named after a beach in the Philippines: Hangin and Tubig.

Contestants 
There were eighteen contestants overall, sixteen of them divided into two tribes, Hangin and Tubig.

The tribes were switched when thirteen players were left in the game. After eight contestants were eliminated, the tribes were combined, or merged, to form one tribe: Araw.

After he returned in the game, winning the last duel of Exile Island, Lucian became the Sole Survivor.

Season summary

Episodes

Voting history
Color key

Ratings

References

Romania
2016 Romanian television seasons
Romanian reality television series
Television shows filmed in the Philippines